Iris Peterson (born 1922) is an American retired flight attendant who flew for United Airlines for 60 years between 1946 and 2007. At the time of her retirement at the age of 85, she was #1 in terms of seniority.

Career
Iris Peterson began her career in 1946. She held various leadership positions in the flight attendants' union. In 1953, she became the first lobbyist for the Air Line Stewards and Stewardesses Association. In 1968, she helped develop safety plans for the first jumbo aircraft. Working with aircraft engineers, 17 safety items were accepted, including the evacuation alarm, now standard equipment on aircraft worldwide. As of 1995 Peterson had the second highest seniority among flight attendants with United. She retired on April 23, 2007 after a 60-year career: she held the world record for longest flight attendant career until 2012 when Ron Akana retired after 62 years.

When she started her career, job restrictions included age, gender, ethnicity and weight, which favored men and discriminated against women. A tribute to Peterson by the United Airlines Association of Flight Attendants notes that she and her peers helped to destroy discriminatory practices, advancing the rights of women and uprooting gender discrimination (example flight attendants' right to be married, which wasn't allowed until 1968).

References

External links
Flights of Fancy, The Guardian, July 7, 2007 
Iris Peterson: 59 Years As A UA Flight Attendant (and still flying!)

1922 births
Possibly living people
Place of birth missing (living people)
20th-century American people
20th-century American women
21st-century American women
Flight attendants
Communications Workers of America people
United Airlines